Rincon Center is a complex of shops, restaurants, offices, and apartments in the South of Market neighborhood of Downtown San Francisco, California. It includes two buildings, one of which is the former Rincon Annex post office building, completed in 1940. Rincon Center occupies an entire city block near the Embarcadero, bounded by Mission, Howard, Spear, and Steuart Streets.

Rincon Annex
Southern Pacific (SP) originally purchased the land where the original Rincon Annex was completed, next to its headquarters for the extension of its rail line to downtown San Francisco, but the western terminus of the San Francisco–Oakland Bay Bridge interfered with the proposed site and the increasing popularity of the automobile also reduced demand for SP's Peninsula Commute service. The original Rincon Annex was designed by Gilbert Stanley Underwood in the Streamline Moderne style. Groundbreaking on the site occurred on June 1, 1939, the building was completed by October 15, 1940, and the facility opened on October 26. The exterior is decorated with stone relief friezes of dolphins above the doorways and windows.

The third floor was used for employee lounge areas, dressing rooms, and offices. At its peak, there were 1,000 to 1,500 Postal Service employees working simultaneously in the building; air conditioning was installed in 1958 to reduce interior temperatures.

The first expansion of Rincon Annex occurred between 1959 and 1960 on the southeast side of the block to handle mail intake and distribution; automated mail sorting machinery was installed in 1963, 1966, and 1966–78. The United States Postal Service (USPS) was spun off as a government corporation in 1972 and because it was less efficient to sort mail in a multilevel facility, the USPS began negotiations to move the mail sorting facility from Rincon Annex to India Basin Park in 1976; the move was completed by 1979. The Rincon Annex building was listed on the National Register of Historic Places the same year.

Murals

The interior of the lobby (parallel to the Mission and Spear street facades) features the History of San Francisco mural series, comprising 27 tempera-on-gesso murals painted by the Russian immigrant artist Anton Refregier from 1941 to 1948 under the Section of Painting and Sculpture of the United States Department of the Treasury. The murals, in the social realism style, depict the history of California and San Francisco's role in it. As they were completed immediately following World War II, they generated fierce controversies. Refregier's detractors criticized his artistic style and questioned his political leanings. The controversy eventually reached the U.S. Congress, where critics called for the murals to be destroyed. The murals led to the preservation of the post office lobby as part of the Rincon Center development.

1980s expansion
In 1978, the United States Postal Service announced it would move the mail sorting facilities from Rincon Annex to a larger building at India Basin, and the Rincon Annex Post Office was shut down by 1979. The San Francisco Board of Supervisors subsequently adopted the Rincon Point – South Beach Project Area Redevelopment Plan on January 5, 1981, which provided controls for land use, development standards, and urban design guidelines for the area including Rincon Annex. Specific Rincon Annex controls were adopted on October 18, 1983, and the USPS entered a 65-year lease with Rincon Center Associates, a partnership headed by Perini Land & Development Company, to develop the former Rincon Annex.

The original building and site was developed into a mixed-use center by Rincon Center Associates; the design was approved on August 20, 1985. The lead designer was Scott Johnson of Pereira Associates, the firm founded by William Pereira, designer of the Transamerica Pyramid. The complex was completed in 1988.

A new mixed-use building on the southeast side of the block contains a new post office, offices, and 320 apartments in twin 23-story towers rising from the commercial levels. The base or commercial podium of the new building is six stories tall. The residences were completed in 1989, originally intended as condominiums. After the completion of Rincon Center, the parcel was divided into four lots: the original Rincon Annex, the commercial "podium" of the new building, the new postal facility, and the residential towers of the new building.

The USPS transferred its ownership of three of the four lots to BRE/Rincon Land LLC in 1999, retaining ownership of the new postal facility only. The buildings were subsequently sold to Beacon Capital Partners in July 2006 for $275 million, and the apartments were sold to Capital Properties in June 2007 for $143 million. Beacon had been planning to convert the apartments to condominiums prior to the sale. Capital Properties took a two-year, $110 million loan from Bear Stearns to fund its purchase; in the wake of that bank's collapse during the Great Recession, the debt was acquired by Carmel Partners, which foreclosed on Capital Properties and took over the residences. In 2010, Capital Properties filed an unsuccessful lawsuit to have the property returned. Beacon Capital sold its remaining interest in Rincon Center to Hudson Pacific in April 2011.

Until the COVID-19 pandemic, San Francisco City Guides led walking tours of the Rincon Annex murals. Because of the pandemic, retail space in the atrium became significantly less viable, and the historic nature of the original Rincon Annex lobby meant the atrium could not be opened to the street to facilitate customer traffic. San Francisco approved an amendment to the redevelopment plan to allow the ground floor retail space to be used as offices in December 2020.

Tenants
Corporate tenants in Rincon Center have included AIG and Salesforce, which moved in 2018 to Salesforce Tower, replaced by Twilio.

Restaurants
Notable restaurants in Rincon Center include Etrusca (1990–93, operated by the Il Fornaio restaurant group) and Yank Sing (1999–present).

Artwork
The Rain Cloud installation art work in the atrium was designed by the contemporary artist Doug Hollis and consisted of a continuous  column of water drops falling from an eight-foot by eight-foot acrylic glass box at ceiling level perforated with 4,000 holes. It was removed in an early 2020s renovation that also removed an Art Deco-inspired frieze by Richard Haas on recent California history from the atrium and installed vegetated panels.

Gallery

Rincon Annex Post Office

History of San Francisco murals in Annex lobby

Rincon Center commercial building (1988)

See also 

List of United States post offices
San Francisco Redevelopment Agency

References

External links 

Rincon Center: Slide show of the Refregier mural panels
 
 

Buildings and structures in San Francisco
South of Market, San Francisco
Post office buildings on the National Register of Historic Places in California
National Register of Historic Places in San Francisco
San Francisco Designated Landmarks
Government buildings completed in 1940
1940s architecture in the United States
Works Progress Administration in California
Streamline Moderne architecture in California
1940 establishments in California